Lőrinc Nacsa (born on April 5, 1990 in Budapest, Hungary) is a Hungarian politician. He is a member of parliament in the National Assembly of Hungary (Országgyűlés) since May 2018. He is a member of the Parliamentary Assembly of the Council of Europe. On 15 June 2021, he was elected one of the Vice-Presidents of the EPP groups in the Parliamentary Assembly of the Council of Europe.

References 

Living people
1990 births
People from Budapest
Hungarian politicians
21st-century Hungarian politicians
Members of the National Assembly of Hungary (2018–2022)
Members of the National Assembly of Hungary (2022–2026)